Esad Razić (born 27 July 1982) is a Bosnian-born Swedish footballer who plays as a midfielder. He is a free agent and his latest club was Rot-Weiß Oberhausen.

References

External links
 

1982 births
Living people
Swedish footballers
Swedish people of Bosnia and Herzegovina descent
Bosnia and Herzegovina emigrants to Sweden
Racing de Ferrol footballers
Olympiakos Nicosia players
AEK Larnaca FC players
FC Den Bosch players
Helmond Sport players
RBC Roosendaal players
TOP Oss players
Rot-Weiß Oberhausen players
Eredivisie players
Eerste Divisie players
Segunda División players
2. Bundesliga players
3. Liga players
Cypriot First Division players
People from Doboj
Expatriate footballers in the Netherlands
Expatriate footballers in Spain
Expatriate footballers in Cyprus
Expatriate footballers in Germany
Association football midfielders